Arkansas Post is an unincorporated community located along the north side of the Arkansas River in Arkansas County, Arkansas. It is home to the Arkansas Post National Memorial.

History
In 1805 the U.S. government established a store at the location, but was closed in 1810, due to competition from private merchants. Nathaniel Pryor, who participated in the Lewis and Clark expedition, and Samuel B. Richards of Natchez established a store at the location after the War of 1812. Present-day Arkansas Post was founded on December 27, 1831, with the establishment of the first U.S. post office in the Arkansas Territory.

Infrastructure
Highway 169 terminates at Arkansas Post.

Notable residents
 Saracen, Quapaw chief

References

Further reading

External links

1831 establishments in Arkansas Territory
Arkansas populated places on the Arkansas River
Unincorporated communities in Arkansas County, Arkansas
Populated places established in 1831